The Castlereagh Nature Reserve is a protected nature reserve located in the western suburbs of Sydney in New South Wales, Australia. In 1960,  was reclaimed for use as a Child Welfare Training School, and in 1971,  was reclaimed for the establishment of a liquid waste disposal facility.

The boundary of the reserve is marked by The Northern Road to the west, by Llandilo Road to the east, rural properties to the south and by the Castlereagh Waste Management Centre to the north. The nature reserve was formerly Castlereagh State Forest and was managed as a production forest from 1917 to 1988, then as a demonstration forest from 1988 to 1995.

Features

Geology 
The Castlereagh Nature Reserve contains a geographically restricted substrate of Tertiary alluvials producing clays, sand, gravel and shales at depth. Parts of the reserve support Cumberland Plain Woodland vegetation. Small, shallow lakes form after wet weather to the north of the reserve where gravels and other alluvials have been extracted when the reserve was a production forest.

Flora 
Open forest occurs on clay soils and is dominated by broad-leaved ironbark Eucalyptus fibrosa sap. Fibrosa with occasional mugga ironbark Eucalyptus sideroxylon, thin-leaved stringybark Eucalyptus enugeniodes, woollybutt Eucalyptus longifolia and Scribbly Gum Eucalyptus sclerophylla. Threatened plant species found in the nature reserve include Dillwynia tenuifolia, Pultenea parviflora, Acacia bynoeana, dwarf casuarina Allocasuarina glareicola, nodding geebung Persoonia nutans and Micromyrtus minutiflora.

The reserve is relatively free of significant weed infestations. A few slash pines Pinus elliotti are found in the northern section of the reserve from when  of Castlereagh State Forest was used for trial plantings of pines in the 1920s and 1930s. Heavy harvesting of ironbark during the Second World War, illegal timber collection and numerous fires generally thinned the forest, resulting in no mature trees in some areas.

Fauna 
The nature reserve is home to a diverse range of mammals including sugar gliders, Petaurus breviceps; brush-tailed possum, Trichosurus vulpecula; and eastern grey kangaroo, Macropus giganteus. The eastern brown snake, Pseudonaja textilis; red-bellied black snake, Psuedechris porphriacus; lace monitor, Varanus varius; and a number of frog species including the endangered green and golden bell frog, Litoria aurea; also reside within the reserve.

Environmental impacts 

In 1987 the area around the old gravel pits was planted with over 3,000 seedlings but ultimately the plantings were unsuccessful. Due to past logging and other plantings, parts of the reserve are dominated by immature regrowth and has modified species composition and abundance.

The contaminated soil was removed in 1996 and replaced with clean local fill. Groundwater quality is monitored at six sampling stations by Waste Services.

Fire has been a major factor in shaping the flora in the reserve. The last major fire occurred in 1982 and burnt over 75 percent of the reserve, which has altered the understory of the forest and woodland communicates. Subsequently, a fire in November 2016 that started near The Northern Road Londonderry burnt through 336 ha of the nature reserve and was contained at Government Road, Berkshire Park.

Accidents 
In 1957 a Vampire fighter jet crashed into Castlereagh State Forest however the Flying Officer was able to eject safely.

See also 

 Protected areas of New South Wales

References 

Nature reserves in Sydney
Hawkesbury River
Protected areas established in 1995
1995 establishments in Australia